Kalleh Dasht may refer to:
 Kalleh Dasht, Gilan
 Kalleh Dasht, Markazi